Matthias Büttner (born 4 November 1990) is a German politician for the populist Alternative for Germany (AfD), having joined in 2014. Since 2017, Büttner is a member of the Bundestag, the German federal legislative body.

Büttner was born 1990 in Stendal, Saxony-Anhalt and became after his abitur IT-specialist.

References

Living people
1990 births
People from Stendal
Members of the Bundestag 2017–2021
Members of the Bundestag for the Alternative for Germany